St. Cecilia: The Elektra Recordings is a compilation album consisting of recordings by the American rock band Stalk–Forrest Group, who would later be known as Blue Öyster Cult. It is a combination of two albums recorded by the group for Elektra Records – one in 1969 and the other in 1970 – as well as the promotional single  released in 1970. Except for the single, the tracks were not officially released until 2001, although bootlegs had existed and individual tracks had been released as bonus tracks to other albums.

History

Recording and single release
The band (originally known as 'Soft White Underbelly') had recorded demos for Elektra Records in 1969 with original vocalist Les Braunstein. Elektra signed the group based on the demos with a $100,000 advance. When vocalist Braunstein left the band, the group re-recorded the songs in New York with new vocalist, former roadie Eric Bloom. The 10-song album was turned in to Elektra completed, mixed and mastered, ready for release. For reasons unclear, Elektra decided not to put out the recordings and ended their recording contract. Back to square one, the band then recorded new demos of several of the songs for Columbia Records in hopes of scoring a record deal. Some of these Columbia demos eventually surfaced as bonus tracks on the re-mastered version of the first Blue Öyster Cult album in 2001. After being rejected by Columbia as well, manager Sandy Pearlman convinced Elektra Records to give the band another shot, and the group traveled to California in February 1970 to begin reworking and re-recording the songs for a full-length album release. Meanwhile, the band had changed its name to Oaxaca, and would soon change it again to Stalk-Forrest Group. Ultimately, after being presented with the two different versions of the album (the one recorded in '69, and the one that featured the new re-worked Feb '70 arrangements), Elektra decided not to release it again, and dropped the band from the label (again).

Subsequent history of Blue Öyster Cult
The group's founder and bass player, Andrew Winters, was expelled from the band as a result of Winters dedicating significantly more time to his job instead of the band. This happened after Sandy Pearlman refused to allow Elektra to release the album that the band cut in California, leading to no gigs and poverty for many months during the spring and summer of 1970, after the band returned to New York. This resulted in the band being dropped by Elektra. The band renamed themselves Blue Öyster Cult, and finally secured a solid recording contract with Columbia Records in 1971.

Bootlegs and official release
The recordings surfaced as a bootleg in the late 1990s. Confusingly, the bootleg was titled Curse of the Hidden Mirrors, after a song on the Elektra album, but Curse of the Hidden Mirror was eventually used as the title of a Blue Öyster Cult studio album in 2001.

The untitled "California" Elektra album was finally released officially in 2001, along with the previously unreleased original '69 sessions, as St. Cecilia: The Elektra Recordings by Rhino Entertainment in a limited, numbered edition of 5000 copies. It is now out of print. This same release was reissued in 2013 by Wounded Bird Records and is also now out of print. Inferior "bootleg" versions of the album with a shuffled track listing are available as grey-area releases, such as St. Cecilia: The California Album on Radioactive Records (not the real Radioactive label, but a grey area label using the same name). These releases are not made from the original master tapes like the Rhino/Wounded Bird release.

Music
 The song "I'm on the Lamb" was re-recorded for Blue Öyster Cult's first proper album Blue Öyster Cult in 1971. It was re-worked and recorded again for the Tyranny & Mutation album (1973), under the title "The Red and the Black".
 The very last part of the song "Gil Blanco County" would later re-emerge at the end of "(Don't Fear) The Reaper" on the popular live album Some Enchanted Evening (1978).
 The chord changes for "Arthur Comics" were recycled for the instrumental "Buck's Boogie", released on the 1975 live album On Your Feet or on Your Knees. More directly, however, the bridge from "Gil Blanco County" was used as the main development section in "Buck's Boogie," although the progression is in D rather than Db in "Buck's Boogie."
 Demo versions of three songs from this album ("What Is Quicksand?", "Donovan's Monkey" and "A Fact About Sneakers"), appear on the remastered CD of the album Blue Öyster Cult, as does a cover of the Bobby Freeman tune "Betty Lou's Got a New Pair of Shoes". Another song from these sessions, "John L. Sullivan", was released on the 2001 promo-only CD "God Save Blue Oyster Cult From Themselves". It was also included in the 2012 Blue Öyster Cult box set that compiles all the band's output during their time at Columbia. All were recorded as demos for Columbia Records in 1969.
 The tracks intended for the Stalk-Forrest Group's debut album (EKS-74046) were reissued on 15 October 2017 by Australian label Blank Recording Co. under the title The Stalk-Forrest Group.

Track listing
 "What Is Quicksand?" (Allen Lanier, Richard Meltzer) – 3:19
 "I'm on the Lamb" (Eric Bloom, Albert Bouchard, Sandy Pearlman) – 3:00
 "Gil Blanco County" (Lanier, Pearlman) – 3:37
 "Donovan's Monkey" (Bouchard, Meltzer) – 3:44
 "Ragamuffin Dumplin'" (Bouchard, Meltzer) – 5:12
 "Curse of the Hidden Mirrors" (Bouchard, Meltzer) – 3:17
 "Arthur Comics" (Bouchard, Meltzer) – 3:11
 "A Fact About Sneakers" (Bouchard, Meltzer) – 7:53
 "St. Cecilia" (Andrew Winters, Bouchard, Pearlman) – 6:48
 "Ragamuffin Dumplin'" (alternate mix) (Bouchard, Meltzer) – 5:19
 "I'm on the Lamb" (alternate take) (Bloom, Bouchard, Pearlman) – 2:54
 "Curse of the Hidden Mirrors" (alternate mix) (Bouchard, Meltzer) – 3:17
 "Bonomo's Turkish Taffy" (deleted from final album) (Bouchard, Meltzer) – 2:14
 "Gil Blanco County" (alternate mix) (Lanier, Pearlman) – 3:37
 "St. Cecilia" (alternate mix) (Bouchard, Pearlman, Winters) – 6:47 
 "A Fact About Sneakers" (alternate take) (Bouchard, Meltzer) – 3:10
 "What Is Quicksand?" (mono single mix) (Lanier, Meltzer) – 3:21
 "Arthur Comics" (mono single mix) (Bouchard, Meltzer) – 3:10

Tracks 1–9 are the finished, but unreleased and untitled Elektra album EKS-74046
Tracks 10–16 taken from earlier version of the unreleased album labeled "OAXACA"
Tracks 17 and 18 are from the Elektra promo single EKM-45693, released July 20, 1970

Personnel 
Eric Bloom a.k.a. "Jesse Python" – lead vocals, guitars
Donald Roeser a.k.a. "Buck Dharma" – lead guitar, vocals
Andrew Winters a.k.a. "Andy Panda" – bass, acoustic guitar on "St. Cecilia." Mr. Winters was never called "Andy Panda," at least not to his face. Guild acoustic guitar played by Andrew Winters courtesy of Jackson Browne.
Allen Lanier a.k.a. "La Verne" – keyboards, guitar
Albert Bouchard a.k.a. "Prince Omega" – drums, vocals

The nicknames in quotes were given to the band members by manager Sandy Pearlman. Nearly all of the members hated the nicknames, with the exception of Donald Roeser, who continues to use "Buck Dharma" as his stage name.

References

Blue Öyster Cult albums
2001 compilation albums
Elektra Records compilation albums
Rhino Records compilation albums